Torqabeh and Shandiz County, formerly Binalud County, is in Razavi Khorasan province, Iran. The capital of the county is the city of Torqabeh. At the 2006 census, the county's population (as Torqabeh District of Mashhad County) was 50,339 in 13,656 households. The following census in 2011 counted 58,483 people in 17,457 households, by which time the district had been separated from the county to form Torqabeh and Shandiz County. At the 2016 census, the county's population was 69,640 in 21,861 households.

Administrative divisions

The population history and structural changes of Torqabeh and Shandiz County's administrative divisions over three consecutive censuses are shown in the following table. The latest census shows two districts, four rural districts, and two cities.

References

 

Counties of Razavi Khorasan Province